Stipa parishii, formerly classified as Achnatherum parishii, is a species of grass known by the common name Parish's needlegrass. The Jepson Manual 2nd edition (2012) reclassified the plant as Stipa parishii var. parishii.

Distribution
The bunchgrass is native to western North America from southern California and Baja California, through Arizona and Nevada, to Utah, where it grows in many types of habitat, especially chaparral and other dry habitats. Locations include the Peninsular Ranges, Mojave Desert sky islands, southern Sierra Nevada and High Sierra, Inyo Mountains, White Mountains, and Great Basin Desert mountains.

Description
Stipa parishii  is a perennial bunch grass which forms tight tufts of erect stems up to about 80 centimeters tall.

The inflorescence is up to 15 centimeters long and packed with densely hairy spikelets. Each spikelet has an awn up to about 3.5 centimeters long. It has a single kink in it, whereas the awns of many other Stipa species have two kinks.

See also
Bunchgrasses of North America
Native grasses of California

References

External links
Jepson Manual Treatment
USDA Plants Profile
Grass Manual Treatment
Photo gallery

parishii
Bunchgrasses of North America
parishii
Grasses of Mexico
Grasses of the United States
Native grasses of California
Flora of Baja California
Flora of Arizona
Flora of Nevada
Flora of Utah
Flora of California
Flora of the California desert regions
Flora of the Great Basin
Flora of the Sierra Nevada (United States)
Natural history of the Mojave Desert
Natural history of the Peninsular Ranges
Flora without expected TNC conservation status